The 2012 Southland Conference baseball tournament took place from May 23 through 26.  The top eight regular season finishers of the league's twelve teams met in the double-elimination tournament held at Texas State University–San Marcos's Bobcat Ballpark in San Marcos, Texas.   won their third Southland Conference Baseball Championship by a score of 13–4 and earned the conference's automatic bid to the 2012 NCAA Division I baseball tournament.

Seeding and format
The top eight finishers from the regular season will be seeded one through eight.

Results

All-Tournament Team
The following players were named to the All-Tournament Team.

Most Valuable Player
Travis Sibley was named Tournament Most Valuable Player.  Sibley was a third baseman for Texas–Arlington.

See also
2012 Southland Conference softball tournament

References

Tournament
Southland Conference Baseball Tournament
Baseball in Texas
Southland Conference baseball tournament
Southland Conference baseball tournament